John Easton (c. 1624–1705) was a politician in colonial Rhode Island

John Easton may also refer to:

 John Easton (philatelist) (1895–1967), British philatelist
 John Easton (baseball) (1933–2001), American baseball player
 John J. Easton Jr. (born 1943), American attorney and Vermont Attorney General
 John Murray Easton (1889–1975), Scottish architect

See also
 John Easton Mills (1796–1847), mayor